James N. Baron is an American sociologist.

Barron earned a bachelor's degree in sociology from Reed College, then completed further study in the subject at University of Wisconsin–Madison, and the University of California, Santa Barbara. Barron began teaching at Stanford University in 1982, where he was named Walter Kenneth Kilpatrick Professor of Organizational Behavior and Human Resources in 1992. He joined the Yale University faculty in 2006, and is  currently the William S. Beinecke Professor at Yale School of Management.

References

Yale School of Management faculty
American sociologists
Living people
Year of birth missing (living people)
University of Wisconsin–Madison College of Letters and Science alumni
Reed College alumni
University of California, Santa Barbara alumni
Stanford University faculty